Doctors' Hospital of Staten Island was a for-profit hospital located in the Concord section of the Staten Island borough of New York City, New York. Founded as Sunnyside Hospital in 1940, it was closed in 2003 and later demolished.

History
Founded as Sunnyside Hospital on Little Clove Road in 1940, it moved to 1050 Targee Street in Concord in 1962–1963 after its original building was demolished to make way for the Staten Island Expressway, part of Interstate 278. The 71-bed hospital was closed in 2003 after a merger with Staten Island University Hospital. The building was demolished and Public School 48 opened on the location in September 2013.

References

Defunct hospitals in Staten Island
Hospitals established in 1940
Hospitals disestablished in 2003